Central Serbia, also referred to as Serbia proper, is the region of Serbia lying outside the autonomous province of Vojvodina to the north and the disputed territory of Kosovo to the south. Central Serbia is a term of convenience, not an administrative division of Serbia as such, and does not have any form of separate administration.
  
Broadly speaking, Central Serbia is the historical core of modern Serbia, which emerged from the Serbian Revolution (1804–17) and subsequent wars against the Ottoman Empire. In the following century, Serbia gradually expanded south, acquiring South Serbia, Kosovo, Sandžak and Vardar Macedonia, and in 1918 – following the unification and annexation of Montenegro and unification of Austro-Hungarian areas left of the Danube and Sava (Vojvodina) – it merged with other South Slavic territories into the Kingdom of Yugoslavia. The current borders of Central Serbia were defined after World War II, when Serbia became a republic within the Socialist Federal Republic of Yugoslavia, with Kosovo and Vojvodina as its autonomous provinces.

Geography
Central Serbia takes up, roughly, the territory of Serbia between the natural borders consisting of the Danube and Sava (in the north), the Drina (in the west), and the "unnatural" border to the southwest with Montenegro, south with Kosovo and North Macedonia, and to the east with Bulgaria, with a small strip of the Danube with Romania in the northeast. The Danube and Sava divides central Serbia from the Serbian province of Vojvodina, while the Drina divides Serbia from Bosnia and Herzegovina. The Great Morava, a major river, goes through central Serbia. Extensions of three major mountain chains are located within Serbia proper: Dinaric Alps in the west and south, and the Carpathians and Balkan Mountains in the east.

Some notable geographical regions located in central Serbia are: Šumadija, Mačva, the Timok Valley (including the Negotin Valley), Pomoravlje, Podunavlje, Posavina,  Podrinje, Zlatibor and Raška.

History

In the Roman period, "Moesia" was the name for a region that included Serbia proper. Viminacium (present-day Kostolac) was the capital of the province of Moesia Superior. Slavs (Sclaveni) overwhelmed the Balkans in the 6th and 7th centuries. The Serbs, a Slavic tribe, were known to have held the area of what is today southwest Serbia in the Early Middle Ages, while the Royal Frankish Annals mention the Braničevci and Timočani, in the eastern parts, in the 9th century. Raška, situated in the southwest, was the core of the medieval Serbian state; Stari Ras has been identified as a capital of the Grand Principality of Serbia. Serbia eventually expanded its borders to the east. The area of most of Serbia proper, as well as areas in eastern Bosnia and Herzegovina, northern Montenegro, Kosovo, and northern Macedonia were called "the Serbian lands", included in the styles of medieval Serbian rulers. King Stefan Dragutin of Syrmia (r. 1282–1316) had two capitals, Debrc and Belgrade. After the fall of the Serbian Empire, the "Moravian Serbia" under Lazar (r. 1373–89) and Stefan Lazarević (r. 1389–1402) corresponded roughly to Serbia proper. Kruševac was the capital of Moravian Serbia, until the Ottoman conquests in the 15th century, and the establishment of the Serbian Despotate, with the capital in Belgrade. After the Ottoman conquest of the Serbian Despotate, the Sanjak of Smederevo was established, initially seated in Smederevo, and eventually, in Belgrade after its fall in 1521 (hence called the "Pashaluk of Belgrade").

Between 1718 and 1739, the Sanjak of Smederevo was occupied by the Habsburg monarchy, which administrated the area as the Kingdom of Serbia. The Serbian Militia operated throughout Serbia proper during the 1737–39 war. The war ended in Ottoman victory, and returning of the sanjak. The northern half of Serbia proper was briefly under Habsburg occupation during the 1787–91 war, then returned. With the First Serbian Uprising (1804–13), the sanjak became a de facto Serbian state, known in historiography as "Revolutionary Serbia". It was retaken by the Ottomans in 1813, however, the Second Serbian Uprising (1815–17) saw Serbia recognized as an autonomous principality within the Ottoman Empire. In 1878, Serbia became a fully independent state, also enlarging its territory to the south-east. The 1878 borders correspond to present-day Central Serbia save for small parts in the south-west.

In the Balkan Wars (1912–13), Serbia further expanded its borders to the south, taking control of much of present-day Kosovo and North Macedonia. Further territorial gains were made in the north (today's Vojvodina) and south-west (Sandžak region) in 1918, after World War I. Serbia became part of the new Kingdom of Serbs, Croats and Slovenes on December 1, 1918. Serbia proper did not have a separate political status within the Kingdom; in 1929, when new provinces of the Kingdom were formed, Serbia proper was divided between five banovine, one of which (Morava Banovina) was established in the east with its capital in Niš.

Between 1941 and 1944, most of the territory was part of the area governed by the Military Administration in Serbia under German Wehrmacht occupation with a Serbian puppet government. The southwestern region of Sandžak was occupied by Italy and annexed to the neighbouring Italian governorate of Montenegro; southern Kosovo was annexed to Albania while southeastern parts annexed by Bulgaria.

The Axis occupation ended in 1944 with the liberation of Yugoslavia by the Yugoslav Partisans; Serbia was formed as one of the republics of the new socialist Yugoslavia. In 1945, Vojvodina and Kosovo became autonomous provinces within Serbia, thus the part of Serbia that was outside these two regions became known as uža Srbija ("Serbia proper"). At the beginning of the 1990s, the term uža Srbija was replaced with the new term Centralna Srbija ("Central Serbia") which was used in all official publications of the Serbian government that referred to the region.

With the formation of new statistical regions of Serbia in 2009–10, three statistical regions: Belgrade, Šumadija and Western Serbia and Southern and Eastern Serbia form Central Serbia.

Administrative divisions

Districts of Serbia, according to the Statistical regions of Serbia.

Demographics
Ethnic groups of Central Serbia according to the 2011 census:

 Serbs: 4,698,515 (89.4%)
 Bosniaks: 135,670 (2.7%)
 Romani: 105,213 (2%)
 Albanians: ~50,000 (0.9%) - estimate; mostly boycotted the 2011 census
 Vlachs: 35,160 (0.6%)
 ethnic Muslims: 18,941 (0.3%)
 Bulgarians: 17,054 (0.3%)
 Montenegrins: 16,386 (0.3%)
 Croats: 10,867 (0.2%)
 Yugoslavs: 10,587 (0.2%)

In 2011, most of the municipalities of Central Serbia had an ethnic Serb majority, three municipalities (Novi Pazar, Tutin, and Sjenica) had a Bosniak majority, two municipalities (Bujanovac and Preševo) had an Albanian majority and two municipalities (Bosilegrad and Dimitrovgrad) had a Bulgarian majority.

Annotations

References

Notes

References 

Socialist Republic of Serbia
Yugoslav Serbia
Former subdivisions of Serbia
Serbia
Regions of Serbia